Karaçavuş, historically Aliyanlı, is a village in the Kilis District, Kilis Province, Turkey. The village had a population of 187 in 2022.

In late 19th century, the village was a settlement of 7 houses inhabited by Kurds.

References

Villages in Kilis District
Kurdish settlements in Kilis Province